WWPS-LP was an affiliate of Cornerstone Television in Kinnelon, New Jersey. The station broadcast to Morris County, New Jersey on VHF channel 9.

History
The station signed on in 1991 as a translator of Cornerstone Television, as W08DF. In 1995 the call sign was changed to WWPS-LP.

 WWPS-LP held an FCC construction permit for a 300-watt digital television transmitter on its existing channel 9; however, they were be required to use a different PSIP, as the PSIP of 9.1 is already used by WWOR-TV, which was broadcast on analog channel 9 prior to the 2009 Digital television transition in the United States. The station's license was cancelled on April 19, 2016.

References

External links
CDBS file for DWWPS-LP (BDFCDVL-20090507ABP)

Television stations in New Jersey
Television channels and stations established in 1991
1991 establishments in New Jersey
Television channels and stations disestablished in 2016
2016 disestablishments in New Jersey
WPS-LP
Defunct television stations in the United States